Boyer is an unincorporated community in Wright County, in the U.S. state of Missouri. The community is located on Missouri Route 5, northwest of Hartville.

History
A post office called Boyer was established in 1884, and remained in operation until 1909. The community has the name of the local Boyer family.

References

Unincorporated communities in Wright County, Missouri
Unincorporated communities in Missouri